Presidential primaries to select the Czech Social Democratic Party candidate for the 2013 presidential elections were held in May 2012. The primaries were indirect, with only members of the party's Central Executive Committee able to vote. Jiří Dienstbier Jr. became the party's candidate after receiving 107 votes to the 35 against. Dienstbier's only rival was Jan Švejnar, who withdrew prior to voting taking place.

Candidates
Jiří Dienstbier Jr. - Senator in Kladno district and most popular politician at the time.
Jan Švejnar - Economist who was party's candidate in 2008. He was supported by Michal Hašek. Švejnar withdrawn from primaries on 9 May 2012 as he wanted to run as independent.

Speculated candidates
Vladimír Špidla - He was speculated to b possible candidate of ČSSD.
Miloš Zeman - There had been speculation that he would stand.
Zdeněk Škromach - He was suggested by some members of ČSSD.

Support of candidates in opinion polls

Results

References

Presidential Primaries 2012
Social Democratic Party presidential primaries
Czech Social Democratic Party presidential primaries
Primary elections in the Czech Republic
Indirect elections
Social Democratic Party presidential primaries